Plocamopherus maculatus is a species of sea slug, a nudibranch, a shell-less marine gastropod mollusk in the family Polyceridae.

Distribution 
This species was described from Hawaii where it is a moderately common nocturnal animal. It has also been reported from the Solomon Islands, the Marshall Islands and South Africa.

References

External links 
 SeaSlug Forum info

Polyceridae
Gastropods described in 1860